Lophocampa neibaensis is a moth of the family Erebidae. It was described by Benoît Vincent in 2005. It is found in the Dominican Republic.

References

 Natural History Museum Lepidoptera generic names catalog
Lophocampa neibaensis at BOLD Systems
Catalogue of the Neotropical Arctiini Leach,  [1815] (except Ctenuchina Kirby, 1837 and  Euchromiina Butler, 1876) (Insecta, Lepidoptera,  Erebidae, Arctiinae) Vincent and Laguerre 2014

neibaensis
Moths described in 2005